Song Liwei (born 16 August 1985) is a retired Chinese basketball player. She represented China at 2006 FIBA World Championship and the 2010 FIBA World Championship.

References

1985 births
Living people
Chinese women's basketball players
Power forwards (basketball)
Basketball players from Heilongjiang
Sportspeople from Qiqihar
Heilongjiang Dragons players
Shenyang Army Golden Lions players